The 2020–21  season is Persija's 87th competitive season. They have not been relegated since the competition started in 1933. This season is Persija's 26th consecutive seasons in top-flight since professional competition formed on 1994. Along with Liga 1, the club will compete in 2020 Piala Indonesia. The season covers the period from 1 January 2020 to 28 February 2021.

Coaching staff

Management

|-

 
|}

New contracts

Transfers

In

Out

Loan In

Loan Out

Squad information

First team squad

Pre-season

Friendly Matches

2020 East Java Governor's Cup

Group stage
Tables

Matches

Knockout Phase

Semifinal

Final

Competitions

Overview

Top scorers
The list is sorted by shirt number when total goals are equal.

Top assist
The list is sorted by shirt number when total assists are equal.

Clean sheets
The list is sorted by shirt number when total clean sheets are equal.

Disciplinary record
Includes all competitive matches. Players listed below made at least one appearance for Persija Jakarta first squad during the season.

Last updated:  
Source: Competitions 
Only competitive matches 
 = Number of bookings;  = Number of sending offs after a second yellow card;  = Number of sending offs by a direct red card.

Summary

Notes

References

Persija Jakarta
Persija Jakarta seasons